Every Time I Turn the Radio On/Talk to Me Ohio is a studio album by American country singer-songwriter Bill Anderson. It was released in January 1975 on MCA Records and was produced by Owen Bradley.

It was Anderson's twenty third studio album to be issued and included three singles that became hits between 1974 and 1975. The album also reached major positions on the Billboard country albums chart upon its release date.

Background and content
Every Time I Turn the Radio On/Talk to Me Ohio was recorded in 1974 in sessions produced by Owen Bradley. Anderson had been under the production of Bradley since early years with the label. It would be their twenty third studio album together. The sessions were held at the RCA Victor Studio in Nashville, Tennessee. This was unlike Anderson's previous sessions that were recorded at Bradley's Barn. The project contained 11 tracks. Eight of the album's tracks were composed entirely by Anderson. The remaining tracks were written by other songwriters and musical artists. Among these were cover versions of songs first recorded by others. One example of this was "Gonna Find Me a Bluebird", which was first recorded by Marvin Rainwater. Another cover on the album is "Let Me Be the One", which was first recorded by Hank Locklin.

Release and chart performance
Every Time I Turn the Radio On/Talk to Me Ohio was released in January 1975 on MCA Records. It was issued as a vinyl LP, with six songs on side one and five songs on side two. After spending ten weeks on the chart, the album peaked at number 22 on the Billboard Top Country Albums chart in March 1975. The album produced three singles between 1974 and 1975. The first was "Every Time I Turn the Radio On", which peaked at number seven on the Billboard Hot Country Singles chart. The song also peaked at number four on the RPM Country Singles chart in Canada. The second single was "I Still Feel the Same About You", the flip side to the title track, "Talk to Me Ohio". The single also became a major hit, peaking at number 14 on the Billboard country chart and number 16 on the Canadian country chart. The third (and final) single issued was the track, "Country D.J." in May 1975. The single only reached number 36 on the Billboard country chart and number 23 on the Canadian country chart after its release.

Track listing

Personnel
All credits are adapted from the liner notes of Every Time I Turn the Radio On/Talk to Me Ohio.

Musical personnel

 Bill Anderson – lead vocals
 Byron Bach – strings
 Brenton Banks – strings
 George Binkley – strings
 Harold Bradley – guitar
 David Briggs – keyboards
 Martin Chantry – strings
 Roy Christensen – strings
 Ray Edenton – guitar
 Gregg Galbraith – dobro, guitar
 Sonny Garrish – steel guitar, dobro
 Jimmy Gateley – fiddle
 Carol Gorodetzsky – strings

 The Holladays – background vocals
 The Jordanaires – background vocals
 Martin Katahn – strings
 Sheldon Kurland – strings
 Billy Linneman – bass
 Bill McElhiney – arrangement
 Bob Moore – bass
 Doug Renaud – drums
 Samuel Terranova – strings
 Gary Vanosdale – strings
 Woody Woodard – keyboards
 Stephanie Woolf – strings

Technical personnel
 Owen Bradley – record producer

Chart performance

Release history

References

1975 albums
Albums produced by Owen Bradley
Bill Anderson (singer) albums
MCA Records albums